Albin Ridefelt (born 23 November 1991) is a Swedish orienteering competitor who runs for the club OK Linné.

He represented Sweden at the 2021 World Orienteering Championships in the Czech Republic, where he placed 12th in the middle distance. He won a gold medal in the men's relay with the Swedish team, along with William Lind and Gustav Bergman.

References

External links

1991 births
Living people
Swedish orienteers
Male orienteers
Foot orienteers
Junior World Orienteering Championships medalists